Holsljunga is a locality situated in Svenljunga Municipality, Västra Götaland County, Sweden with 255 inhabitants in 2010.

Sports
The following sports clubs are located in Holsljunga:

 Högvads BK

Manufacturing 
Sahlins Sweden AB develops, manufactures and sells products and methods for cable network construction world wide. The company was founded 1969.

References 

Populated places in Västra Götaland County
Populated places in Svenljunga Municipality